This is a list of Belgian television related events from 1961.

Events
29 January - Bob Benny is selected to represent Belgium at the 1961 Eurovision Song Contest with his song "September, gouden roos". He is selected to be the sixth Belgian Eurovision entry during Eurosong.

Debuts

Television shows

Ending this year

Births

Deaths